Malcolm Pratt "Mac" Aldrich (October 1, 1900 – July 31, 1986) was an American football player for the Yale Bulldogs football team of Yale University from 1919 to 1921.  He was recognized as a consensus first-team All-American at the halfback position in 1921. 
Aldrich was inducted into the College Football Hall of Fame in 1972. He died July 31, 1986, at age 85.

Yale
Aldrich was the Yale Bulldogs' senior team captain in 1921, and excelled as a runner and passer.  He drop-kicked a 48-yard field goal against Brown, and defeated the Princeton Tigers 13-7 by kicking two fourth-quarter field goals.  He scored 86 points on the season, making him the nation's third leading scorer in 1921.

Aldrich was also the Yale Bulldogs baseball captain. He played catcher.

Commonwealth Fund
After graduating from Yale in 1922, he joined the Commonwealth Fund, which donated money for medical education.  He became the Fund president in 1940, chairman in 1963, and received an award for distinguished service from the American Medical Association. His older brother, banking executive Hulbert Aldrich, succeeded him as president of the Commonwealth Fund.

World War II
Aldrich served in the U.S. Navy during World War II.

References

External links
 

1900 births
1986 deaths
American football halfbacks
Yale Bulldogs football players
All-American college football players
College Football Hall of Fame inductees
United States Navy personnel of World War II
Sportspeople from Fall River, Massachusetts
Players of American football from Massachusetts
Military personnel from Massachusetts